Luis Rodolfo Ojeda Alva (born November 28, 1982) is a Peruvian football midfielder from the district of Chancay in Huaral, Peru. He is currently a free agent.

Club career
From 2007-2008, Ojeda played in Atlético Minero along with his brother Román Ojeda in the Peruvian First Division. In 2009, he transferred, along with his brother to Sporting Cristal.

References

External links

1982 births
Living people
People from Lima Region
Association football midfielders
Peruvian footballers
C.D. Bella Esperanza footballers
Olímpico Somos Perú footballers
Universidad Técnica de Cajamarca footballers
Sporting Cristal footballers
Colegio Nacional Iquitos footballers
Sport Boys footballers
Cienciano footballers
Peruvian Segunda División players
Peruvian Primera División players